Josef Lebeda (11 October 1911 – 5 June 1988) was an Austrian footballer. He played in two matches for the Austria national football team in 1935.

References

External links
 

1911 births
1988 deaths
Austrian footballers
Austria international footballers
Place of birth missing
Association footballers not categorized by position